Lesogaberan (AZD-3355) was  an experimental drug candidate developed by AstraZeneca for the treatment of gastroesophageal reflux disease (GERD).  As a GABAB receptor agonist, it has the same mechanism of action as baclofen, but is anticipated to have fewer of the central nervous system side effects that limit the clinical use of baclofen for the treatment of GERD.

References

Abandoned drugs
GABAB receptor agonists
Organofluorides
AstraZeneca brands
Phosphinic acids